St. Anne's College may refer to:

St Anne's College, Leuven
St Anne's College, Oxford
St. Anne's College (Sri Lanka)